The 2014 Oldham Metropolitan Borough Council election took place on 22 May 2014 to elect members of Oldham Metropolitan Borough Council in England. This was on the same day as other local elections.

Labour retained control of the Council.

After the election, the composition of the council was

Labour 45
Liberal Democrat 10
Conservative 2
UKIP 2
Independent 1

Election result

Ward results

Alexandra ward

Chadderton Central ward

Chadderton North ward

Chadderton South ward

Coldhurst ward

Crompton ward

Failsworth East ward

Failsworth West ward

Hollinwood ward

Medlock Vale ward

Royton North ward

Royton South ward

Saddleworth North ward

Saddleworth South ward

Saddleworth West & Lees ward

Shaw ward

St. James ward (2)

St. Mary's ward

Waterhead ward

Werneth ward

References

2014 English local elections
2014
2010s in Greater Manchester